Luděk Zelenka (born 11 September 1973) is a former Czech football player.

Zelenka played for various top Gambrinus liga clubs during his career and was a prolific goalscorer. In the 2004-2005 season he scored 12 goals, becoming the second best goalscorer of the season. At the end of 2009 he ended his professional career.

References

External links
 Player profile at fczbrno.cz (FC Zbrojovka Brno official site)
 
 Profile at Bohemians 1905 website

1973 births
Living people
Czech footballers
Czech expatriate footballers
Czech First League players
FK Jablonec players
FK Viktoria Žižkov players
SK Slavia Prague players
FK Teplice players
FK Chmel Blšany players
FC Zbrojovka Brno players
FC Kärnten players
FK Dukla Prague players
Bohemians 1905 players
Expatriate footballers in Austria
Sportspeople from Liberec
Association football forwards